= NYC Metro =

NYC Metro may refer to:

- New York metropolitan area
- New York City Subway
